Ilhéu de Sal Rei is an uninhabited islet near the coast of Boa Vista Island, Cape Verde.

The islet has exposed basaltic and limestone rock, and there are sandy beaches in sheltered areas. The entire islet is a natural monument. The headland Ponta de Escuma is the islet's westernmost point. A narrow strait to its northeast separates it from Boa Vista island by 500 to 600 meters. On the southern tip of the island, the ruined Portuguese fort Duque de Bragança is situated.

Ponta da Escuma Lighthouse

According to the NGA the light is still active, has a solar power unit and emits five flashes white or red depending from the direction in a twenty seconds period visible up to 11 nautical miles.

Gallery

See also
List of lighthouses in Cape Verde

References

Uninhabited islands of Cape Verde
Geography of Boa Vista, Cape Verde
Protected areas of Cape Verde
Ilhéu de Sal Rei
Sal Rei